Cloud-Reese House is a historic home located near Wilmington, New Castle County, Delaware. The original was built about 1770, and forms the rear wing.  The main section dates to about 1820, and is a three-bay, two-story, stuccoed stone dwelling.  In 1929, the house was renovated in the Colonial Revival style.  This included the addition of a wing was added with a kitchen, pantry, laundry, three-car garage, and servants' quarters. Also on the property is a contributing low stone wall.

It was added to the National Register of Historic Places in 2001.

References

Houses on the National Register of Historic Places in Delaware
Colonial Revival architecture in Delaware
Houses completed in 1929
Houses in Wilmington, Delaware
National Register of Historic Places in Wilmington, Delaware